Doktor Martin may refer to:
 Doktor Martin (German TV series)
 Doktor Martin (Czech TV series)